André Santos Esteves (born July 12, 1968) is a Brazilian billionaire businessman. Among Brazilian billionaires, Esteves is ranked 6th with a net worth of R$20.75 billion, according to Forbes business magazine. He currently serves as senior partner and chairman at BTG Pactual, the biggest investment bank in Latin America, and also as board member of Conservation International. In 2015, he was arrested by the Brazilian Federal Police in the context of the anti-corruption Operation Car Wash, and remained in prison for around three weeks; in December 2018, Esteves was acquitted of corruption charges. At a meeting on April 29, 2022, the shareholders of the bank reappointed Esteves as board chairman.

Personal life 
André Esteves was born into a middle-class family in Rio de Janeiro, and obtained his bachelor's degree in computer science from the Federal University of Rio de Janeiro.  Esteves has three children, and The New York Times writes that "he has driven the same Mercedes pickup for four years and takes only two weeks of vacation a year", though he also owns a Dassault Falcon private jet worth $50 million USD When interviewed about his downtime, "Esteves professes a love of his job, though he also enjoys cinema, wine and good food."

Career 
After graduating from the Federal University of Rio de Janeiro, André Esteves joined Pactual and within "a year he was a member of the bank's foreign debt trading team, and within two he was managing IPOs and M&A deals." In 1992, Esteves made a partner for helping the bank "to post a 59 percent return on capital". UBS purchased Pactual in December 2006, and in June 2008, Esteves left the bank along with key Brazilian partners to create BTG, a global investment company. In April 2009, Esteves, along with other partners, purchased Pactual back from UBS for $2.5 billion. He discussed these events in 2013 in an interview for the Creating Emerging Markets project at the Harvard Business School. Esteves arrives at his office as early as 6:30 AM and "often calls partners together for meetings as late as 10:00 p.m." He also holds regular study meetings with BTG Pactual directors at his home.

Philanthropy 
James Crombie of LatinFinance writes that "Esteves supports education and environmental charities". André Esteves has also supported initiatives, projects and institutions that help to improve education, healthcare and promote arts in Brazil. Institutions like the Universidade de São Paulo, the "Hospital de Câncer de Barretos" and the Museu de Arte Moderna de São Paulo are among those supported by Esteves.

Esteves Hall 
André Esteves made a significant personal donation to Harvard Business School, in order to renovate the former Baker Hall, located on the campus of Harvard University; now renamed as Esteves Hall, in honor of him. This Harvard dormitory is used by the School's Executive Education programs, which annually attract some 10,000 executives from around the globe, many from Esteves' home country, Brazil.

Environment 
Esteves is also known for his pro-environment activities, most of them in private. He is a board member at Conservation International and played an active role supporting the Amazonia Live program, a project to plant one million trees, in partnership with one of the biggest music festivals of the world, Rock in Rio.

Prizes 
 Person of the Year by the Brazilian Chamber of Commerce of UK in 2014.
 Person of the Year by the US-Brazil Chamber of Commerce in 2012.
 One of the 50 most influential people in the world by "Bloomberg" in 2012.
 Prominent Executive in the area of banks and financial institutions by Valor Econômico newspaper for three consecutive years, in 2011, 2012 and 2013.
 One of the most admired leaders of the Year by Carta Capital magazine for two consecutive years in 2011 and 2012.
 One of the "100 Most Influential Brazilians " by Epoca magazine for four consecutive years, in 2009, 2010, 2011 and 2012.
 Personality of the Year by Latin Finance in 2010.
 One of the 25 most influential executives in the financial sector, according to Institutional Investor survey in 2009.
 Entrepreneur of the year, according to the "Isto É Dinheiro" magazine for two years, in 2011 and 2014. 
 Appointed leader in Financial by Leaders of Brazil in 2012.

BTG Pactual 
	

	
BTG Pactual, bank in which André Esteves is chairman and senior partner, offers advisory services in merger transactions and acquisitions, equity, debt underwriting, asset management, wealth management, sales and trading, loans and financing (corporate lending) and fund management for clients including corporations, financial institutions, governments and high-net-worth people. The bank is also active in proprietary investments (both class of net assets as of non-liquid assets). It is recognized as one of the leading investment banks in emerging markets, the largest independent investment bank and the largest asset manager in Brazil.

Controversy

Insider trading 
In April 2012, André Esteves was fined €350,000 for insider trading in Italy and officials "also froze €4.2 million of Mr. Esteves's personal assets and barred him from acting as an officer in an Italian company for six months." Italy’s Consob did this because, they said, that "the 43-year-old Latin American banker bought the shares in November 2007 knowing that the group was planning to enter a joint venture with Brazilian rival JBS." This case was closed and there was no impact to the public offering. In 2012, penalties for André Esteves' insider trading "force[d] the bank to amend its prospectus, give investors the option to reconsidering bids for BTG shares, and put a cloud over one of this year's highest-profile bank deals." In "a statement, BTG Pactual said Esteves believed the allegations had no merit and was determined to appeal the decision." However, Esteves did not appeal, citing cost and a loss of time as his reasons.[32]

In 2013,  Charles Rosier, a partner of BTG Pactual, was convicted in the largest insider trading case in the history of France. While at UBS, at the end of March and early April 2008, he and his cousin Joseph Raad used inside information to purchase shares and options in Geodis just before the announcement of a takeover bid. Of significance, Rosier worked at UBS when he participated in the insider trades when André Esteves, now CEO, partner and director of BTG Pactual, still worked for UBS as head of fixed income in charge of $1.7 trillion USD. Esteves had also committed inside trades while at UBS only a few months earlier in November 2007. Also of significance, Huw Jenkins, partner and director and chairman of BTG Pactual and formerly CEO of UBS Investment Bank, was a consultant to UBS at the same time.

Pactual sale to UBS then BTG 
Arthur Rutishauser in Sonntagszeitung argued that the way Esteves acquired 27% of his bank is an example of an insider case: Esteves sold the bank in 2006 for 3.1 billion SFr to UBS, where Huw Jenkins was a key decision maker and heavily involved in that transaction. Esteves later repurchased Pactual back in 2009 for 2.5 billion SF after being allowed to leave UBS to set up BTG. Huw Jenkins was ejected from UBS in 2007 and disappeared then resurfaced as a senior partner and board member at BTG Pactual in 2010.

Lawsuit in Hong Kong by ex-employee 
CEO of BTG Pactual André Esteves, and member of the board of directors Huw Jenkins reportedly "made fraudulent misrepresentations to get Zeljko Ivic to sign agreements with Banco BTG Pactual SA, according to a lawsuit filed with the Hong Kong High Court." Robert Tibbo, Zeljko Ivic's attorney, said that Zeljko Ivic played a key role in Banco BTG Pactual SA's initial public offering (IPO). Ivic said he was the key player in fundraising from nine entities, including the China Investment Corporation, GIC Private Limited, as well as the Agnelli and Rothschild families. Ivic is suing for $20 million USD compensation for the BTG Pactual shares, promised partnership and unpaid bonuses.

Conflict with Brazilian regulators and Central Bank 
Bloomberg reported that "In three separate cases since 1999, Brazil’s central bank and securities commission alleged Pactual had illegally transferred profits to foreign funds to disguise gains and avoid taxes." As such, "Esteves and his partners received warnings in the first two incidents." Furthermore, "In the third, he and another partner were ordered to pay a combined settlement of 100,000 reais ($50,000), with Pactual paying another 4 million reais."

Involvement in Sete 
On 19 June 2015, Marcelo Odebrecht, the CEO of Brazil’s largest construction company was arrested by Brazilian Federal Police. Odebrecht was arrested on allegations of fraud, corruption, money laundering and organized crime relating to contracts worth billions of dollars with the rigs company  and the state oil company Petrobras. While in detention, Odebrecht attempted to pass a handwritten note to his lawyers that mentioned André Esteves, thus potentially implicating BTG Pactual and Esteves in Lava Jato. One of Sete’s largest shareholders is BTG Pactual, headed by CEO André Esteves. In the handwritten note, Odebrecht asked his lawyers to "destroy rigs’ email."
Sete Brasil was founded to facilitate and enable the construction of ultra-deep water drilling rigs in the country. Seven companies became investors, the pension funds: Petros, Previ, Funcef and Valia, besides the banks Santander, Bradesco and BTG Pactual. Then Petrobras joined the investors. Development bank BNDES, which had previously agreed to extend financing, withheld funds after former Sete Brasil COO Pedro Barusco testified in late 2014 that he accepted bribes in exchange for awarding contracts as part of a wider corruption probe known as Lava Jato (Carwash in Portuguese). In the first quarter of 2015, BTG Pactual recorded a provision for the impairment to the investment equivalent to approximately 25% of its book value, which had a gross negative impact on revenues of R$280million.

Arrest and release
On 25 November 2015, Esteves was arrested as part of a scandal investigation into Petrobras after he was investigated for his bank's dealings with the oil company. On November 29, 2015 it was reported that the Brazilian Supreme Court decided to extend his arrest, according to Esteves's lawyer. According to the same report by Bloomberg News, BTG Pactual's partners were in talks to buy Esteves's 22% to 24% stake including a "golden share" which had given him control of the firm.

Three weeks later, on December 17, 2015, Esteves was released from prison. BTG's bonds and shares subsequently increased. Esteves had to remain at home until he found employment, the Brazilian supreme court said in a statement. Judge Teori Zavascki ruled that Esteves could not have any management role in any of the companies being investigated as part of the corruption probe. The names of those companies were kept sealed. Shares of BTG rose 7.7 percent to 15.62 reais at 3:55 p.m. in Sao Paulo, after gaining as much as 12 percent. The company's $1 billion of notes due 2020 rose 3.1 cents to 72.15 cents on the dollar. Esteves’s attorneys argued that he was only arrested because he's one of the wealthiest people in Brazil, according to court documents filed this month with the supreme court.

On the 27 April 2016, hours after Brazil's Supreme Court freed him from house arrest, a smiling Esteves addressed employees at Grupo BTG Pactual’s headquarters. The bank confirmed in a statement that he will be a senior partner, advising on strategy and the development of activities and operations. In his remarks, Esteves denied wrongdoing, as he has in the past; as part of Operation Carwash. Brazil's high court lifted that order, and Esteves’s lawyer, Antonio Carlos de Almeida Castro, said by text message that the billionaire is free of all charges and can return to the office. BTG shares rose 1.6 percent to 19.97 reais as of 4:38 p.m. in Sao Paulo trading on Wednesday. It followed a 6.2 percent rally on Tuesday.

Judicial error 
Already considered one of the biggest judicial errors in Brazil, Esteves was acquitted of all charges. On June 28, 2017, the Chief Justice of the Brazilian Supreme Court, Gilmar Mendes, referred André Esteves' case during the plenary session of the Supreme Court, "This is a fact of which we are witnesses. I must praise the loyalty that Minister Teori Zavascki also had with this case, when he verified this is a clear case of unequivocal judicial error, about which no one speaks because only success is spoken." Minister Sepúlveda Pertence was arguing and used the following expression: 'I am facing a scabrous case of judicial error'. Minister Zavascki convinced himself and decided monocratically. "How many may be in the same situation as Esteves?"

On September 1, 2017, federal prosecutors asked Esteves acquittal on the grounds that there is no evidence that he participated in the criminal scheme. The agency gave the Federal Court in Brasilia the closing arguments in the criminal case in which he presents the conclusions based on the evidence and testimony made. The Federal Prosecution Service says it has not found evidence that Esteves committed the crime of obstruction of justice. "André was improperly involved in this process, the instruction proved this completely," said Antônio Carlos de Almeida Castro, Esteves's lawyer, on the request for acquittal.

On July 12, 2018, Judge Ricardo Leite of the 10th Federal Court of Brasilia acquitted Esteves of the accusations of obstruction of justice for confirmation that there was insufficient evidence to corroborate the allegations. Following the acquittal, Esteves' lawyers stated that "they respect the duty of the State to investigate, however, any investigation must be conducted within due process of law, without spectacularization and without excesses. In this case, Esteves' initial arrest was completely unnecessary and abusive."

References 

1968 births
Brazilian bankers
Brazilian billionaires
Brazilian chief executives
Living people